Daniel Glass (born May 16, 1966) is an American drummer, author, historian and educator. He is recognized in the drum industry as an authority on classic American drumming and the evolution of American Popular Music.

Educator/Clinician 

As an educator, Glass has published several books and DVDs, including, The Century Project DVD (winner of the Modern Drummer reader's poll: Best Education Package, 2010), Music Alive!'s Percussion, The Commandments of Early Rhythm and Blues Drumming (co-written with Zoro and the winner of the 2009 Drum! Magazine Drummie Award for "Best Drumming Book.") and The Roots of Rock Drumming (co-edited with Journey drummer, Steve Smith and voted one of the top four drumming books of 2014 by Drum! Magazine.) Glass has also contributed to the Encyclopedia of Percussion (second edition) with the "Rock 'n' Roll Drumming (1948-2000)" chapter, and is a regular contributor to publications like Modern Drummer, Drum! and Classic Drummer Magazine. He has performed hundreds of clinics and master classes globally, appearing at many educational conferences and music festivals. In 2013, he co-curated an exhibit on the history of the drum set at the Rhythm Discovery Center in Indianapolis, Indiana, for which he was awarded the Percussive Arts Society’s "Distinguished Service Award."

Performer 

Glass is a member of the pioneering swing group Royal Crown Revue since 1994, Glass has recorded and performed all over the world with many artists, including Brian Setzer, Bette Midler, Liza Minnelli, Marilyn Maye, Klea Blackhurst, Lorna Luft, Chita Rivera, Lucie Arnaz, Freddy Cole, Mike Ness, Johnny Boyd, Debbie Davies, Unknown Hinson, Glen Glenn, Robert Gordon, and Gene Simmons of KISS. He was twice voted one of the top five R&B drummers in the world by readers of Modern Drummer and Drum! magazine.

Discography

With Royal Crown Revue

With other artists

Endorsements

Glass endorses Drum Workshop/DW Drums (drums/pedals/hardware), Crescent cymbals, Vic Firth (drumsticks and brushes), and Aquarian Drumheads.

References

External links
 Official Daniel Glass web site
 Daniel Glass on Drummerworld.com

American writers about music
Music historians
American educators
1966 births
Living people
20th-century American drummers
American male drummers
20th-century American male musicians